All 4 is a video on demand service from the Channel Four Television Corporation, free of charge for most content and funded by advertising. The service is available in the UK and Ireland; viewers are not required to have a TV licence—required for live viewing and the BBC iPlayer on-demand service—when watching on-demand services. The service launched on 16 November 2006 as 4oD (for "4 on Demand"). The service offers a variety of programmes recently shown on Channel 4, E4, More4, Film4 and E4 Extra and shorts. However some programmes and movies are not available due to rights issues. The service was originally available without registration, but free registration was later required. The service is available without advertising (except for live viewing) on payment of a subscription, under the name All 4+.

The cable and IPTV versions are operated through an appropriate set-top box, the Internet variant can be accessed via their website, and there are apps for mobile devices. All 4 generated around 215 million long-form video views on all platforms where it is available in the first half of 2011, making Channel 4 the biggest commercial UK broadcaster in the video on-demand market during the period.

On 30 March 2015, 4oD was merged into and renamed All 4. (References below to "All 4" before that date should be understood as including 4oD.)

On 1 March 2019, All 4 was rebranded with a new logo, website design and app design.

All 4 is set to rebrand as Channel 4 in 2023, becoming the "first UK broadcaster to adopt one brand identity across its digital and linear channels".

Web platforms

Channel4.com
All 4 is the main source of on demand programmes from Channel 4, E4, and More4. The catch up service currently lasts 30 days, and the archive has thousands of hours of programming.

As of April 2009, the internet version is fully available to Mac and Windows users with Adobe Flash Player installed.

The "catch-up" service offers content free of charge for 30 days after a programme's broadcast on Channel 4. As of 2011, not all content is available to Irish users, due to licensing restrictions; however, the majority of the programming is available. Live streaming of Channel 4 and its sister channels is not available outside the UK.

Channel 4 relaunched 4oD on 31 August 2011. At the heart of the changes is 'My 4oD', allowing registered users to build playlists, schedule shows, maintain a record of what they have watched, save their favourites in a single place, and receive in-page reminders from Channel 4 whenever a new episode is available for them to watch. Other features include better full-page viewing and optimised site navigation during viewing.

Since 2014, the service stops users with ad blocking software from watching videos on All 4.

Other providers of Channel 4 content

Amazon Instant Video
Amazon Instant Video has a content deal with Channel 4, giving its members streaming access to All 4's archive in a specially branded All 4 collection.

Blinkbox
Blinkbox previously acquired licenses for a number of programmes to be access on its website, although All 4 itself is not available. Some TV series are available free of charge, such as Balls of Steel, Embarrassing Bodies, Shameless UK, and Skins, while others, for example ER, Shameless US, and The Big Bang Theory, are charged for.

Netflix
Netflix bought the rights to a number of Channel 4 shows, such as Father Ted, The IT Crowd, and  The Inbetweeners, which were shown without adverts. These shows were removed from Netflix in the UK on 15 February 2014.

YouTube
4oD launched on YouTube in the UK in late 2009, with seven genre-dedicated channels for 4oD additional to separate channels Channel 4 and E4. However, it was announced on 7 January 2014 that Channel 4 had removed all its long-form programming from YouTube in order to focus on the 4oD platform itself, although programming from 4Shorts and Mashed would remain available. On May 11, 2022, Channel 4 announced that a select amount of shows would be made available on YouTube and selected programmes would be made available on YouTube 30 days after being broadcast on Channel 4 and E4.

Third party "box-set" content
During 2020 Channel 4 entered a new licensing deal with the Walt Disney Company for distributing a variety of older 20th Century Fox programming as part of All 4's expanding "box set" feature. In June, Buffy the Vampire Slayer was introduced, followed by Angel in September 2020, and Malcolm in the Middle in October 2020.

2023 rebrand
On 2 November 2022, Channel 4 announced plans to rebrand it's on-demand service, All 4, as Channel 4. In a statement released by Channel 4, the change enabled it to become "the first UK broadcaster to adopt one brand identity across its digital and linear channels". It was also announced that their portfolio of channels will also align with the Channel 4 branding. It will take place in Spring 2023.

Television platforms

Blu-ray players and televisions
An All 4 app for the Samsung Smart TV service was released on 22 March 2013.

Freesat
All 4 became available as part of Freesat's second generation Free Time guide on 27 June 2013, offering the last seven days of programming integrated to the TV guide and access to the All 4 archive via the on demand section.
As of 22 February 2018 All 4 will no longer be available on Freesat services.

Sky
All 4 was added to Sky's On Demand service on 18 March 2013.

Virgin Media
All 4 is available on Virgin Media's cable television service. This platform offers programmes for 7 days after broadcast and Virgin has exclusive use of most of Channel 4 archive which is free on XL package. In 2007, Virgin Media announced plans to offer high definition programming through All 4 but  no further information has been released.

YouView
All 4 was one of four services available at the launch of YouView in July 2012. At launch, the All 4 app contained options to resume watching recent programmes and browse by most popular, categories, collections, and A-to-Z, but lacked a search function and contained non-skippable adverts. It is also available for BT TV and TalkTalk Plus TV customers, as these services run on YouView.

Game consoles

PlayStation 3
All 4 was released on 14 December 2010 on PlayStation 3 via the PlayStation Network. This service was accessible through ps3.channel4.com, but has now been replaced with a native app. The app version of All 4 for PlayStation 3 was released on 20 June 2013, allowing access to the full All 4 library. All 4 on PS3 is free and ad-funded with pre-, mid- and post-roll video ads being sold and served by Channel 4. The service closed on PS3 systems on 31 January 2021.

PlayStation 4
The All 4 app was launched on PlayStation 4 on 23 December 2015.

PlayStation 5
All 4 is now available on the PlayStation 5.

Xbox 360
On 5 October 2011, it was announced that All 4 would be made available to all Xbox Live Gold members. The service also integrates with the Xbox 360's Kinect controller. All 4 was added to the Xbox Live on 21 December 2011. All content on Xbox Live contains ads which cannot be skipped.

Xbox One
On 8 November 2013, Channel 4 announced that the All 4 app would be available on Xbox One when it launched on 22 November 2013. In August 2019, the app was removed from the Microsoft Store. It was later released with inferior features to other platforms.

Mobile platforms

Android devices
An All 4 app for the Android operating system was released on 5 February 2013.  Android version 5.0 or greater is required. The service does not support devices it detects as rooted.

iOS devices

An All 4 iPad app launched on 3 May 2011, offering a 30-day catch-up service.  this app was compatible with iPad with iOS 3.2 or later. The design of the app was elegant and intuitive but received unfavourable reviews because of technical issues and its use of commercial breaks. Since 2013 download and offline watching is supported.

An All 4 app for the iPhone and iPod Touch allowing a 30-day catch-up was released on 2 September 2011, along with an update to the iPad app. Both apps support search functionality to enable users to navigate the catch-up and archive content. They can both be browsed in 3G, but video playback is still only available with a Wi-Fi signal to "ensure the quality of the viewing experience isn't affected". The app also links to Channel 4's content on iTunes, allowing programmes to be purchased.

Windows Phone
On 13 November 2013, a native All 4 app was launched for mobile phones running the Windows Phone 8 platform.

Computer platforms
The service was originally available as a Windows-only desktop program for downloading shows similar to BBC iPlayer Desktop. Following the launch of the web version of 4oD in April 2009, the desktop client continued to allow content from outside the catch-up window to be downloaded. The Kontiki based program which offered Windows Media Video downloads was closed in July 2009.

The desktop client offered programming from other broadcasters such as FX and National Geographic as well as movies from 20th Century Fox. A Download To Own (DTO) or "Buy" feature was also available on selected content, allowing users to purchase a programme and keep it for as long as they wish.

On 17 December 2012, Channel 4 and Microsoft released a dedicated All 4 application for Windows 8. The move saw Channel 4 become the first major UK broadcaster to support the operating system with a native app.

Exclusive programming
 Channel 4 Shorts (2014–present)
 Walter Presents (2016–present) - foreign language titles
 The Island with Bear Grylls USA (2016–present)
 Hunted America (2017–present)
 Don't Hug Me I'm Scared (2022–present)

See also
 Film4oD
 BBC iPlayer
 ITVX
 My5
 List of streaming media services

References

External links

 

Channel 4
British entertainment websites
Television websites
Video on demand services
2006 establishments in the United Kingdom
Internet properties established in 2006
PlayStation 4 software